The Canton of Saint-Claude may refer to:

Canton of Saint-Claude, Jura, a French canton in the department of Jura
Canton of Saint-Claude, Guadeloupe, a French former canton in the department of Guadeloupe